William Parker may refer to:

Entertainment
 William Parker (musician) (born 1952), American jazz double bassist
 William Parker (screenwriter) (1886–1941), American screenwriter
 William Parker (Private Practice), character in the series TV Private Practice
 F. William Parker (born 1941), American actor

Military
 William Parker (privateer) (died 1617), English captain and privateer, and also mayor of Plymouth.
 Sir William Parker, 1st Baronet, of Harburn (1743–1802), British admiral
 Sir William Parker, 1st Baronet, of Shenstone (1781–1866), British admiral
 William Harwar Parker (1826–1896), United States Navy officer
 William Parker (Medal of Honor) (1832–?), American Civil War sailor and Medal of Honor recipient
 William Albert Parker, American Civil War Union Navy commander of James River forces

Politicians
 William Parker (died 1403), Member of Parliament (MP) for London
 William Parker (died 1421), MP for Hertfordshire
 William Parker (fl.1410), MP for Great Yarmouth
 William Parker, 4th Baron Monteagle (1575–1622), English politician
 William H. Parker (politician) (1847–1908), US Representative from South Dakota
 William Parker (Boston) (1793–1873), businessman and politician in the United States
 William Parker (MP) (1802–1892), British Member of Parliament for West Suffolk, 1859–1880
 William Parker (Oregon politician), member of the Oregon Territorial Legislature, 1850
 William T. Parker (1928–2014), member of the Virginia Senate and House of Delegates

Religion
 William Parker (priest) (died 1631), rose to Archdeacon in two diocese
 William Parker (priest, died 1802) (c.1749–1802), Anglican controversialist
 William Parker (bishop) (1897–1982), Bishop of Shrewsbury in the Church of England

Sports
 Willie Parker (defensive tackle) (born 1945), former American football defensive tackle
 Willie Parker (offensive lineman) (born 1948), former American football center
 Willie Parker (born 1980), American football running back
 William Parker (Oxford University cricketer) (1832–1873), English cricketer
 William Parker (New Zealand cricketer) (1862–1930), New Zealand cricketer
 William Parker (MCC cricketer) (1886–1915), English cricketer
 William Parker (bowls) (1892–1979), English bowls player
 Will Parker (1873–1955), rugby union player
 Sir William Parker, 3rd Baronet (1889–1971), British rower and Olympic medalist
 Smush Parker (born 1981), American basketball player
 Tony Parker (William Anthony Parker II, born 1982), French basketball player

Other people
 William Parker (early settler) (1618–1686), settler in the Connecticut colony
 William Parker (builder) (1800–1854), St. John's, Newfoundland builder
 William Parker (abolitionist) (1821–1891), anti-slavery activist and freedom fighter
 William Parker (glassmaker) (?–1817), American glassmaker and inventor
 William Kitchen Parker (1823–1890), British physician and comparative anatomist
 William Parker (master) (1870–1953), Australian barrister in New South Wales
 William Belmont Parker (1871–1934), United States editor
 William H. Parker (physicist) (1941–), American physicist
 William H. Parker (police officer) (1905–1966), Chief of the Los Angeles Police Department

See also
 Bill Parker (disambiguation)
 Billy Parker (disambiguation)